David Mitchell (born March 12, 1984 in Moose Jaw, Saskatchewan) is a Canadian lacrosse player who plays for the Philadelphia Wings in the National Lacrosse League.

College career
Mitchell is a graduate of Cornell University.  As a senior he was awarded with second All-American team honors, and named to the first All-Ivy League team while leading the Big Red to the 2007 NCAA Division I Men's Lacrosse Championship Final Four.

Professional career

Major League Lacrosse
Mitchell was selected by the Boston Cannons as a first round selection (8th overall) in the 2007 MLL  Draft Major League Lacrosse Collegiate Draft. On July 14, 2007, he netted a rookie season-high four goals against the Chicago Machine. Prior to the 2008 MLL season, Mitchell was traded to the San Francisco Dragons. He was picked up in late July 2008 by the Chicago Machine after being waived by the Dragons.

National Lacrosse League
The Philadelphia Wings drafted Mitchell in the Second Round (25th overall) in the 2007 National Lacrosse League Entry Draft.

Statistics

MLL

NLL

NCAA

References

1984 births
Canadian expatriate lacrosse people in the United States
Canadian lacrosse players
Cornell Big Red men's lacrosse players
Lacrosse forwards
Living people
Major League Lacrosse players
Philadelphia Wings players
Sportspeople from Moose Jaw